Siloh, Trecynon was an Independent (Congregationalist) chapel in Mount Pleasant, Trecynon, Aberdare, Wales.

Early history
Silo was formed in 1887 when Rev. David Onllwyn Brace and around fifty members broke away from Bethel, Gadlys. Meetings were initially held at the Swan Coffee Tavern and at the home of one Richard Wigley. As membership increased the congregation moved to the Park School.  The original chapel was opened in April 1890 when the Revs. J. Rees, Treherbert; A. T. Jenkins, Ferndale; and W. G. Williams, Penarth, preached at special services over two days.

A new chapel was built in 1902, designed by Thomas Roderick. A gallery was added two years later.

The membership was never as large as that of some other churches in the locality. Membership stood at 154 in 1905 and 138 in 1930.

The pastorate of J. Sulgwyn Davies 1891–1934
Sulgwyn Davies was minister for 43 years. He died in 1939.

20th century
Members from Carmel worshipped at Siloh following the closure of their chapel in 1988. Siloh itself closed in 1996.

References

Bibliography

External links

Coflein entry

Chapels in Rhondda Cynon Taf
Aberdare